The Parliamentary Under-Secretary of State for Exports (Minister for Exports) is a junior position in the Department for International Trade of the Government of the United Kingdom.

Responsibilities 
The minister has responsibility of the following policy areas:

 Export policy and promotion, including the export strategy
 UK Export Finance (UKEF)
 UK Defence and Security Exports
 climate change and COP26
 GREAT campaign
 trade missions
 global events
 investment policy in the House of Commons

Officeholders 

Colour key (for political parties):

References 

Department for International Trade
Trade in the United Kingdom
Trade ministers
Trade ministers of the United Kingdom
2018 establishments in the United Kingdom